Father Clément Cormier,  (January 15, 1910 – July 28, 1987) was a Canadian priest, academic and the vice chancellor and founder of Université de Moncton.

Born in Moncton, New Brunswick, the son of Clément Cormier and Léontine Breau, he received a Bachelor of Arts in 1931, from Université Saint-Joseph. He was ordained in 1936. In 1940 he received another Bachelor's degree from Université Laval. From 1948 until 1953, he was the rector of Université Saint-Joseph. From 1973 until 1978, he was the Chancellor of the Université de Moncton.

In 1967 he was made an Officer of the Order of Canada and was promoted to Companion in 1972.

References
 
 

1910 births
1987 deaths
Acadian people
Canadian clergy
Canadian university and college chancellors
Companions of the Order of Canada
People from Moncton
Université Laval alumni